Apollo 11 was the first mission that sent people to the surface of the Moon.

Apollo 11 may also refer to:
 Apollo 11 (1996 film), a telefilm
 Apollo 11 (2019 film), a documentary film
 Apollo Eleven (horse), a racehorse
 Apollo 11 Cave, an archeological site in the ǁKaras Region of Namibia
 "Apollo XI", a song by Orchestral Manoeuvres in the Dark from Sugar Tax

See also
 Apollo (disambiguation)
 Apollo II